Fusignano is a comune in the province of Ravenna (Emilia-Romagna) in Italy. It is located on the river Senio.

History
The city was created in 1250 by count Bernardino of Cunio after a flood which had destroyed his castle at Donigallia. After several passages of property in the hands of local noble families, the castle of Fusignano was transferred to the Este family in 1445.

When the Duchy of Ferrara was annexed to the Papal States (1598), the fief was elevated to a marquisate, which in 1622, after a long struggle with the Corelli family, was acquired by the Calcagnini. In the 18th century the city recovered from a dark period, and in 1796 became part of the French dominions. In 1815 it returned to the Roman Church. With the unification of Italy (1860), Fusignano was separated from Ferrara and included in the province of Ravenna.

During World War II, as part of the Spring 1945 offensive in Italy, Fusignano was for four months on the front line, and reduced to ruins.

Main sights
The church of San Giovanni Battista houses a 16th-century pale portraying the Baptism of Christ. In the church of San Savino the ancient sepulchre of the namesake saint, one of the first evangelizers of Romagna, can be seen: however, the remains it contained were transferred by Astorre II Manfredi to a chapel in the Cathedral of Faenza.

Twin towns

Fusignano is twinned with:
 Biddulph, United Kingdom

Personalities

 Arcangelo Corelli (1653 in Fusignano – 1713) Italian violin player  and Baroque music composer
 Lea Melandri (born 1941 in Fusignano) feminist  and writer
 Arrigo Sacchi (born 1946 in Fusignano) Italian football manager,

References

Cities and towns in Emilia-Romagna